The men's 1500 metres event at the 2014 Asian Games was held at the Incheon Asiad Main Stadium, Incheon, South Korea on 28–29 September.

Schedule
All times are Korea Standard Time (UTC+09:00)

Records

Results
Legend
DNS — Did not start

Round 1
 Qualification: First 4 in each heat (Q) and the next 4 fastest (q) advance to the final.

Heat 1

Heat 2

Final

References

results

1500 metres men
2014